The Defense Nuclear Facilities Safety Board is an independent agency of the United States government based in Washington, D.C. Established in 1988, the DNFSB oversees the nuclear weapons complex administered by the U.S. Department of Energy. The DNFSB is independent of the Department of Energy. The DNFSB's most important power is its ability to give recommendations to the Secretary of Energy.

See also
Title 10 of the Code of Federal Regulations
Waste Isolation Pilot Plant

External links
 
 Departmental Representative to the Board

Nuclear safety and security
Nuclear weapons infrastructure of the United States
1988 establishments in Washington, D.C.
Independent agencies of the United States government